Liotia microgrammata is a species of sea snail, a marine gastropod mollusk in the family Liotiidae.

Description
The shell grows to a length of 2 mm.

Distribution
This species occurs in the Caribbean Sea off Cuba at a depth of about 350 m.

Description

Distribution

References

  Dall W. H. (1927). Small shells from dredgings off the southeast coast of the United states by the United States Fisheries Steamer "Albatross", in 1885 and 1886. Proceedings of the United States National Museum, 70(18): 1-134
 Rosenberg, G., F. Moretzsohn, and E. F. García. 2009. Gastropoda (Mollusca) of the Gulf of Mexico, Pp. 579–699 in Felder, D.L. and D.K. Camp (eds.), Gulf of Mexico–Origins, Waters, and Biota. Biodiversity. Texas A&M Press, College Station, Texas.

microgrammata
Gastropods described in 1927